William Henry Francis (February 28, 1879 – January 26, 1942) was a Negro leagues Third baseman for a few years before the founding of the first Negro National League, and in its first few seasons.

He was playing for the Philadelphia Giants at the age of 27 years in 1906, and continued with that team until 1910, playing Winter Ball for the Matanzas team in Cuba in 1908 and 1909.

Francis went to the Leland Giants in 1911 and stayed there for three seasons. He went back to Cuba, playing for Club Fé in 1912-1913.

During a 1914 four-game series against the Chicago Giants, sportswriter Cary B. Lewis said of Francis, "Although short, Francis runs like a deer." Sources show Lewis stood 5 foot, 5 inches tall.

In 1918, 39 year-old Francis registered for the WWI Draft. He lists his current occupation as "Laborer" for the Illinois Plating Company on Randolph Street in Chicago, Illinois. He lists his nearest relative as Mamie Francis.

When Francis left Chicago in 1919, he played the rest of the season for the Detroit Stars.

At the forming of the first Negro National League, the 41-year-old Francis found himself on the Hilldale Club where he would also manage the team.

Francis died in Chicago, Illinois at the age of 62. He is buried at Lincoln Cemetery in Blue Island, Illinois.

References

External links
 and Baseball-Reference Black Baseball stats and Seamheads

Negro league baseball managers
Chicago American Giants players
Cleveland Browns (baseball) players
Detroit Stars players
Philadelphia Giants players
Lincoln Giants players
Club Fé players
Hilldale Club players
Bacharach Giants players
Matanzas players
1879 births
1942 deaths
Baseball players from Philadelphia
Baseball third basemen
Baseball player-managers
American expatriate baseball players in Cuba
20th-century African-American people